The Ult 160 is a front loader that was produced by 14. oktobar in Kruševac, Serbia. Ult 160 is the successor of Ult 150 front loaders.

References

1985 establishments in Serbia
Heavy equipment